The 2016–17 season was Olympique Lyonnais's 67th professional season since its creation in 1950.

Players

Squad information

Transfers

In

Loans in

Out

Loans out

Competitions

Overall

Trophée des Champions

Ligue 1

League table

Results summary

Results by round

Matches

Coupe de France

Coupe de la Ligue

UEFA Champions League

Group stage

UEFA Europa League

Knockout phase

Round of 32

Round of 16

Quarter-final

Semi-final

Statistics

Appearances and goals

|-
! colspan=18 style=background:#dcdcdc; text-align:center| Goalkeepers

|-
! colspan=18 style=background:#dcdcdc; text-align:center| Defenders

|-
! colspan=18 style=background:#dcdcdc; text-align:center| Midfielders

|-
! colspan=18 style=background:#dcdcdc; text-align:center| Forwards

|-
! colspan=18 style=background:#dcdcdc; text-align:center| Players transferred out during the season

Goalscorers

Kit

In the Europa League quarter-final second leg match at Beşiktaş, Lyon wore their previous season away kit above all three of their kits in this season.

References

Lyon
Lyon
Olympique Lyonnais seasons